Museo delle Cere is a wax museum in City of San Marino, San Marino.

External links
 

Buildings and structures in the City of San Marino
Museums in San Marino
Wax museums